Elizabeth Blanche Olofio was a Central African Republic radio journalist who was injured on January 8, 2013 when rebels stormed a radio station in Bambari during the Central African Republic conflict.

While her death was initially misreported, she did die at a later date from injuries sustained during the initial attack.

Sparked by this event, Reporters Without Borders signed an open letter appealing to the government and the international community to comply with and enforce the right to information and to protect journalists.

References

2013 deaths
Central African Republic journalists
Year of birth missing
Journalists killed in the Central African Republic
People of the Central African Republic Civil War
Central African Republic women